The National Women Basketball League, known as Zenith Women Basketball League for sponsorship reasons is the top-level women's basketball club competition in Nigeria. It is the women's version of Nigeria Premier League organized by the Nigeria Basketball Federation. The league also determines the Nigerian representatives at FIBA Africa Women's Clubs Champions Cup.

History 
The league started with five teams, however the number grew to eighteen by 2017. The league has been sponsored by Zenith Bank since 2004. In 2017, after the expiration of the contract agreement between NBBF and Zenith Bank, the banking institution renewed the terms of the negotiation with bigger winning bonus for the teams. The winner of the league receives a  ₦30,000,000 prize money. The league is criticized for being overly dominated by First Bank, First Deepwater and Dolphins.

Teams 
The following are the eighteen teams that participate in the league:

List of winners

References 

Women's basketball leagues in Africa